Zero the Kamikaze Squirrel is a video game developed by Iguana Entertainment, and published by Sunsoft in 1994. It is a spin-off/sequel of the Aero the Acro-Bat series and was released for the Sega Genesis in October 1994 and for the Super NES in November 1994, along with the release of Aero the Acro-Bat 2.

The main star is Zero, Aero's rival from the previous games. A remake for the Game Boy Advance was planned in 2003, but it was cancelled.

Plot
During the events of Aero the Acro-Bat 2, Zero receives a telegram from his girlfriend Amy telling him that an evil lumberjack named Jacques Le Sheets is deforesting their homeland Stony Forest to produce counterfeit money and has also captured her father. Ignoring Edgar Ektor's protests, Zero decides to put a stop to Le Sheets. Upon arriving at the island, Zero's plane is shot down and crashes on the beach, so he starts making his way to the forest on foot. During his journey, Zero learns that Amy has also been captured after an unsuccessful attempt to save her father by herself. At the paper factory, Zero fights Le Sheets and pursues him on a flying ship. Aboard the ship, Zero finds that the mastermind is none other than Edgar Ektor. After defeating Ektor with Amy's assistance, the two squirrels parachute safely away, while Ektor's ship crashes into a cliff.

Development
While David Siller was drawing and designing the concept art for Aero the Acro-Bat, his son Justin introduced a character who went up to the same level as Aero and put his thoughts on paper. Using the traits and sketches, it took a year to turn the concept character Zero into a digitized sprite. Siller submitted his proposal to Sunsoft and they approved it. The plot was based on the character animation. Some of the enemy boss sprites were rendered with 3-D Studio. The audio was based on a number of traditional Japanese melodies and sounds and incorporated a rock n' roll soundtrack. A number of ideas from the original concept were left out. The game was finally finished and released by fall. The game was showcased at 1994 Summer Consumer Electronics Show in Chicago.

Reception

The four reviewers of Electronic Gaming Monthly gave the Genesis version an 8.25 out of 10, praising Zero's innovative techniques, especially his dive and swoop moves, and the colorful graphics, which one of the reviewers said surpass the Genesis's theoretical color limits. Captain Squideo of GamePro, in contrast, commented that while most of Zero's moves are fun, the dive and swoop moves are too difficult to control. He shared EGM's approval for the game's colorful graphics, but concluded that "difficult controls make this martial arts squirrel less than an instant superstar". He made similar remarks of the SNES version, which he described as "identical" to the Genesis version, but this time concluded Zero the Kamikaze Squirrel to be an overall good game despite its drawbacks. Power Unlimited gave a more negative review criticizing the plot being weak, described the controls as "incomprehensible" and "Almost Impossible to reach" levels.

See also
Aero the Acro-Bat
Aero the Acro-Bat 2

References

External links

Justin Siller's website

1994 video games
Cancelled Game Boy Advance games
Anthropomorphic squirrels
Fictional squirrels
Sunsoft games
Sega Genesis games
Super Nintendo Entertainment System games
Platform games
Video games developed in the United States
Single-player video games